Tim Smyczek was the defending champion but chose not to defend his title.

Reilly Opelka won the title after defeating Ryan Shane 7–6(8–6), 6–3 in the final.

Seeds

Draw

Finals

Top half

Bottom half

References
Main Draw
Qualifying Draw

JSM Challenger of Champaign-Urbana - Singles
2018 Singles